The Greatest Painting in Britain Vote was a survey made by BBC Radio 4's Today programme in Summer 2005 with the aim of discovering the best-loved painting in Britain, in the manner of 100 Greatest Britons and The Big Read. It was criticised for the conservatism of the final selection as well as the unsuitability of the idea for the non-visual medium of radio.

The winner, voted for by the public from a shortlist of 10, was announced on air on 5 September 2005.

The Top Ten

External links
 Weblog entry with digest of media responses to the poll

2005 in the United Kingdom
2005 radio programme debuts
Surveys (human research)
Paintings in the United Kingdom
United Kingdom-related lists
Lists of paintings